Gnosall is a civil parish in the Borough of Stafford, Staffordshire, England. It contains 20 listed buildings that are recorded in the National Heritage List for England. Of these, one is listed at Grade I, the highest of the three grades, and the others are at Grade II, the lowest grade.  The parish contains the villages of Gnosall and Gnosall Heath and the surrounding area.  The Shropshire Union Canal passes through the parish, and the listed buildings associated with it are bridges and two mileposts.  The other listed buildings include a church, houses, cottages, farmhouses and farm buildings, a former windmill, a village lock-up, and a milepost on a road.



Key

Buildings

References

Citations

Sources

Lists of listed buildings in Staffordshire